The golden-crowned tanager (Iridosornis rufivertex) is a species of bird in the family Thraupidae.

It is found in Colombia, Ecuador, Peru, and Venezuela. Its natural habitat is subtropical or tropical moist montane forests.

References

golden-crowned tanager
Birds of the Colombian Andes
Birds of the Ecuadorian Andes
golden-crowned tanager
Taxonomy articles created by Polbot